Trechus pseudocholaensis is a species of ground beetle in the subfamily Trechinae. It was described by Deuve in 1998.

References

pseudocholaensis
Beetles described in 1998